The 2011 World Sambo Championships were held in Vilnius, Lithuania on November 11 to 13 for men's and women's sport Sambo and the Combat Sambo championships was held in Siemens Arena.

Categories 
Combat Sambo: 52 kg, 57 kg, 62 kg, 68 kg, 74 kg, 82 kg, 90 kg, 100 kg, +100 kg
Men's Sambo: 52 kg, 57 kg, 62 kg, 68 kg, 74 kg, 82 kg, 90 kg, 100 kg, +100 kg
Women's Sambo: 48 kg, 52 kg, 56 kg, 60 kg, 64 kg, 68 kg, 72 kg, 80 kg, +80 kg

Medal overview

Combat Sambo Events

Men's Sambo Events

Women's events

Medal table

External links 
results

World Sambo Championships
World Sambo Championships, 2006
Sports competitions in Vilnius
2011 in sambo (martial art)
November 2011 sports events in Europe
21st century in Vilnius